Paul v. Virginia, 75 U.S. (8 Wall.) 168 (1869), is a U.S. corporate law decision by the United States Supreme Court. It held that a corporation is not a citizen within the meaning of the Privileges and Immunities Clause. Of greater consequence, the Court further held that "issuing a policy of insurance is not a transaction of commerce," effectively removing the business of insurance beyond the United States Congress's legislative reach (until partially overturned in United States v. South-Eastern Underwriters Association).

Facts
In the 19th century, the insurance business was exclusively regulated by the states, individually. As a result, a patchwork of separate regulations proliferated to the dismay of insurance companies which sought uniform regulation across states. In an effort to promote federal regulation of the insurance industry, a number of New York insurance companies orchestrated a test case to try to invalidate state regulation. On February 3, 1866, the legislature of Virginia had passed a statute provided that an insurance company not incorporated under the laws of the state should not carry on its business within the State without previously obtaining a license for that purpose and that it should not receive such license until it had deposited with the treasurer of the state bonds in an amount varying from thirty to fifty thousand dollars.

In May 1866, Samuel Paul, a resident of the Commonwealth of Virginia, was appointed the agent of the New York insurance companies, to carry on the general business of insurance against fire. He then applied for a license to act as such agent within the state, offering at the time to comply with all the requirements of the statute with the exception of the provision requiring a deposit of bonds with the treasurer of the state. Based on his failure to comply with the requirements of the statute, the license was refused. Notwithstanding this refusal he undertook to act in the State as agent for the New York companies without any license.

Paul sold a fire insurance policy to a citizen of Virginia. He was then indicted and convicted in the Circuit Court of the city of Petersburg, and was sentenced to pay a fine of $50. Paul claimed that the statute was invalid.

Judgment

Supreme Court of Virginia
The Supreme Court of Appeals of the State, the judgment was affirmed, and the case was then appealed to the Supreme Court. Paul claimed that the writ of error on the judgment in the lower court violated Privileges and Immunities Clause, which provides that "The Citizens of each State shall be entitled to all Privileges and Immunities of Citizens in the several States" and the Commerce Clause, which empowers Congress "to regulate commerce with foreign nations, and among the several States."

Supreme Court of the United States

The US Supreme Court held that a corporation is not a citizen within the meaning of the Privileges and Immunities Clause. A corporation has a right to operate in states where it is not incorporated where that state allows it to. It also held that "issuing a policy of insurance is not a transaction of commerce," effectively removing the business of insurance beyond the United States Congress's legislative reach.

Significance
In 1944, the Supreme Court overturned the holding of Paul v. Virginia in United States v. South-Eastern Underwriters Ass'n, finding that insurance transactions were subject to federal regulation under the Commerce Clause.

See also

US corporate law
Legal person
Insurance law

Notes

References
Henry N. Butler, Nineteenth century jurisdictional competition in the granting of corporate privileges (1985) 14(1) Journal of Legal Studies 129
F Tung, Before Competition: Origins of the Internal Affairs Doctrine (2006) 32 Iowa Journal of Corporate Law 33

External links

 

1869 in United States case law
1869 in Virginia
Legal history of Virginia
United States Constitution Article One case law
United States Constitution Article Four case law
Privileges and Immunities case law
United States Commerce Clause case law
United States Supreme Court cases
United States Supreme Court cases of the Chase Court
Corporate personhood
Insurance in the United States